Ross Stephen Crane is an English footballer who plays for  side Needham Market, where he plays as a winger.

Club career

AFC Sudbury
Crane joined AFC Sudbry  form the Colchester United academy. He featured for Sudbury's first-team during the 2018–19 season.

Bury Town
He joined Bury Town from Sudbury in 2019. He played 33 games for Bury Town during the 2019–20 season, scoring 2 goals.

Ipswich Town
On 22 May 2020 Ipswich Town announced that Crane would sign for the club on a free transfer on 1 July 2020, signing a two-year contract. He made his debut for the club as an 82nd minute substitute in a 2–0 win over Gillingham in an EFL Trophy group stage tie on 6 October 2020.

Needham Market
On 4 August 2022, Crane signed for Needham Market following his release from Ipswich Town.

Career statistics

References

External links

Living people
Sportspeople from Ipswich
English footballers
Association football midfielders
A.F.C. Sudbury players
Bury Town F.C. players
Ipswich Town F.C. players
Concord Rangers F.C. players
Needham Market F.C. players
Isthmian League players
National League (English football) players
Year of birth missing (living people)